Richard Lipp was an Anglican bishop: he was  bishop of North Kerala from 1954 to 1959.

References

6

 Church of South India clergy
 Anglican bishops of North Kerala